The siege of Syracuse in 827–828 marks the first attempt by the Aghlabids to conquer the city of Syracuse in Sicily, then a Byzantine province. The Aghlabid army had only months before landed on Sicily, ostensibly in support of the rebel Byzantine general Euphemius. After defeating local forces and taking the fortress of Mazara, they marched on Syracuse, which was the capital of the island under Roman and Byzantine rule. The siege lasted through the winter of 827–828 and until summer, during which time the besieging forces suffered greatly from lack of food and an outbreak of an epidemic, which claimed the life of their commander, Asad ibn al-Furat. In the face of Byzantine reinforcements, the new Arab leader, Muhammad ibn Abi'l-Jawari, abandoned the siege and withdrew to the southwestern part of the island, which remained in their hands. From there they pursued the slow conquest of Sicily, which led to the fall of Syracuse after another long siege in 877–878, and culminated in the fall of Taormina in 902.

See also
 Siege of Syracuse (877–878)

Sources
 
 
 

827
820s conflicts
820s in the Byzantine Empire
Syracuse 827
Syracuse 827
Byzantine Sicily
History of Syracuse, Sicily
Muslim conquest of Sicily
828
Syracuse 827